Zeller, meaning both prisoner and monk in German, may refer to:

Places
Zeller Ache, a river of Upper Austria
Zeller Bach (Isar), a river of Bavaria, Germany, tributary of the Isar
Zeller Bach (Memminger Ach), a river of Bavaria, Germany, tributary of the Kressenbach (upper course of the Memminger Ach)
Zeller Bach (Irrsee), a river of the Salzkammergut, Upper Austria, tributary of the Irrsee
Zeller Blauen (more rarely: Hochblauen), a mountain in the southern Black Forest in Germany
Zeller See, various lakes in Austria and Germany
 Zeller See (Lake Constance), part of Lower Lake Constance, Baden-Württemberg, Germany

 Lake Zell, a lake in the Pinzgau near Zell am See, Zell am See District, state of Salzburg, Austria
 Zeller See or Irrsee, a lake in the Salzkammergut near Zell am Moos, Vöcklabruck District, Upper Austria, Austria
Zeller Glacier, glacier in Antarctica
Zeller Horn, a mountain of Baden-Württemberg, Germany
Zeller Valley, a valley in the Bavarian Forest in southern Germany

People
Zeller (surname)

In fiction
 Sniper rifle in the 2006 computer game Battlefield 2142
 Herr Zeller, the Gauleiter, in both The Sound of Music, musical and movie
 Julie Zeller in the play "Liliom", which was the basis for Carousel (musical)

Other uses
Heinrich Zeller House, also known as Fort Zeller and Zeller's Fort, is a historic -story building that has served as a fort, block house and residence. The historic structure is located in Millcreek Township, Lebanon County, Pennsylvania
Jo Zeller Racing, a Swiss motor racing team
 Zeller's congruence, an algorithm to calculate the day of the week for any Julian or Gregorian calendar date.